WHQQ (98.9 FM, "98.9 The Game") is a radio station licensed to serve Neoga, Illinois, United States. The station is owned by the Cromwell Radio Group and the broadcast license is held by The Cromwell Group, Inc. of Illinois.

WHQQ broadcasts a sports format branded as "The Game" to the greater Effingham-Mattoon, Illinois, area. The station most recent previous format was adult hits with the branding "98.9 Jack FM".

The station was assigned the WHQQ call sign by the Federal Communications Commission on October 31, 1997.

Translators
WHQQ programming is also carried on a broadcast translator station to extend or improve the coverage area of the station.

References

External links
Official Website
Cromwell Radio Group

HQQ
Sports radio stations in the United States
Radio stations established in 1996
Cumberland County, Illinois